INS Ajay may refer to the following vessels of the Indian Navy:

 , an  launched in 1960 and given to Bangladesh in 1974 where she served as BNS Surma
 , an  commissioned in 1990

Indian Navy ship names